Ayun Ha Lake is an artificial lake in Gia Lai Province, Vietnam. The lake was formed when the Ayun River was stopped early in 1994, to start the construction of a dam and lake for irrigation. The flooded area of the lake district belongs to the commune of HBong Chu Se.

References

Lakes of Vietnam
Landforms of Gia Lai province